Tanikhel , is a town and union council, an administrative subdivision, of Mianwali District in the Punjab province of Pakistan. It is part of Isakhel Tehsil.

References

Union councils of Mianwali District
Populated places in Mianwali District